Pseudatomoscelis is a genus of plant bugs in the family Miridae. There are at least four described species in Pseudatomoscelis.

Species
These four species belong to the genus Pseudatomoscelis:
 Pseudatomoscelis flora (Van Duzee, 1923)
 Pseudatomoscelis insularis Henry, 1991
 Pseudatomoscelis nubila T.Henry, 2002
 Pseudatomoscelis seriatus (Reuter, 1876) (cotton fleahopper)

References

Further reading

External links

 

Phylini
Articles created by Qbugbot